Adrish Bardhan (1 December 1932 – 20 May 2019) was a Bengali science fiction writer, editor and translator.

Career 

Bardhan was born on 1 December 1932 in Calcutta in British India. He graduated with a BSc from the University of Calcutta. He started his career as purchase manager of a private company. After the resignation of the service Bardhan started writing detective stories and science fiction. His creation, detective Indranath Rudra, lady detective Narayani and Professor Nut Boltu Chakra got huge popularity among the Bengali readers. In 1963 Bardhan edited Ascharya, the first science fiction magazine of India. He also became the editor of the Fantastic magazine. He received Kishor Gyan Biggan Purashkar, Sudhindranath Raha Awards for his contributions in Bengali science fiction literature. Bardhan was the founder secretary of Science fiction cine club.

Death
In January 2019, Bardhan was hospitalised to Nil Ratan Sircar Medical College and Hospital due to physical illness. He died on 21 May 2019 at the age of 87 in his own apartment.

Awards
 Sudhindranath Raha Purashkar
 Kisore Jnan-Bijnan Purashkar
 Dineshchandra Smriti Purashkar
 Moumachhi Smriti Purashkar
 Rotary Smriti Puraskar 
 Kalpabiswa Sammanana

References

1932 births
2019 deaths
Bengali-language writers
Bengali writers
Bengali-language science fiction writers
University of Calcutta alumni
Bengali detective fiction writers
Indian male novelists
Writers from Kolkata
20th-century Indian novelists